Abel Makashvili also known as Avel Gavrilovich Makaev (June 6, 1860 – June 1920) was a Georgian prince and soldier who served successively in the Russian, Georgian and Azerbaijani militaries and was killed by the Bolsheviks upon their conquest of Azerbaijan in 1920.  

Born of an old Georgian noble family, Makashvili graduated from Elizavetgrad military progymnasium and Kazan infantry junker school. He joined the Imperial Russian army in 1877 and commanded Bash-Kadyklar infantry regiment since 1910. He was promoted to major-general in 1914 and put in charge of the 16th Mingrelian grenadier regiment from 1914 to 1917. After Georgia’s declaration of independence from Russia, Makashvili joined the national Georgian army. He served as a governor-general and military commandant of Tiflis in the years 1918-1920. Early in 1920, he was invited by the government of independent Azerbaijan to head a military school at Ganja. After Sovietization of Azerbaijan in April 1920, 

According to one version, Makashvili was arrested by the Soviet authorities and drowned in the Caspian Sea. According to another version, he was killed by Armenian terrorists on the orders of the Dashnaktsutyun party

Makashvili’s sons also served in the military. One of them, Vakhtang, commanded the Georgian Air Force and died when the airplane he piloted crashed at Tiflis in 1921.

References  

1860 births
1920 deaths
Generals from Georgia (country)
Nobility of Georgia (country)
Imperial Russian Army generals
Georgian generals in the Imperial Russian Army
Georgian major generals (Imperial Russia)
Recipients of the Order of Saint Stanislaus (Russian)
People of World War I from Georgia (country)